Per Morten Kristiansen (born 14 July 1981 in Sarpsborg) is a Norwegian football goalkeeper who last played for FK Haugesund.

His former clubs are Greåker IF, Fredrikstad and Moss.

Career statistics

References
Per Morten Kristiansen at Footballdatabase

1981 births
Living people
Norwegian footballers
Fredrikstad FK players
Moss FK players
FK Haugesund players
Eliteserien players
People from Sarpsborg
Association football goalkeepers
Sportspeople from Viken (county)